David W. Parsons is a Canadian Anglican bishop. He has been the bishop of the Diocese of The Arctic in northern Canada since 2012.

He had previously served as regional dean of the Mackenzie Delta, and priest at Inuvik and Tulita in the Northwest Territories. He was commissioned as an evangelist in 1989 in the then Church Army in Canada, now Threshold Ministries.

He is a theological conservative. He and suffragan bishop Darren McCartney were the only Anglican Church of Canada bishops to attend the Global Anglican Future Conference, held in Nairobi, Kenya, from 21 to 26 October 2013.

Notes

 

Year of birth missing (living people)
Living people
Anglican bishops of The Arctic
21st-century Anglican Church of Canada bishops
Church Army people